Josse Judocus Joseph de Lehaye-Dael (28 May 1800 – 22 September 1888) was a Belgian magistrate and liberal politician.

As a politician, he was a member of the National Congress, burgomaster of Merendree, member of the municipal council and mayor of Ghent (1854–1857), member of the provincial council of the province of East Flanders and a member of parliament. He was President of the Belgian Chamber of Representatives from 25 April 1855 until 13 June 1857.

See also
Liberal Party
Liberalism in Belgium

Sources
Josse Joseph de Lehaye
Balthazar, H., in : Nationaal Biografisch Woordenboek, Brussel, Koninklijke Vlaamse Academiën van België, 1964-, II, 1966, kol. 165–168.
Lebrocquy, G., Types et Profils parlementaires, Paris, Lachaud & Burdin, 1873, p. 502-506.
De Paepe, Jean-Luc, Raindorf-Gérard, Christiane (ed.), Le Parlement Belge 1831-1894. Données Biographiques, Brussel, Académie Royale de Belgique, 1996, p. 159.

1800 births
1888 deaths
Mayors of Ghent
Members of the National Congress of Belgium
Presidents of the Chamber of Representatives (Belgium)